Eupithecia infecta is a moth in the family Geometridae. It is found in China (Shensi).

In 2013, Vladimir Mironov and Anthony Galsworthy classified it as a junior synonym of E. laricarata.

References

Moths described in 1981
infecta
Moths of Asia